Harriman-and-West Airport , also known as Harriman & West or Harriman-West, is a public airport located three nautical miles (5 km) west of the central business district of North Adams, a city in Berkshire County, Massachusetts, United States. It is owned by the City of North Adams and is operated by a five-member Airport Commission.

This airport is assigned a three-letter location identifier of AQW by the Federal Aviation Administration, but it does not have an International Air Transport Association (IATA) airport code.

Facilities and aircraft 
There are 39 aircraft based on the field. For the 12-month period ending November 6, 2012, the airport had 31,755 aircraft operations, an average of 87 per day: 96% general aviation, 3% air taxi and 1% military.

References

External links 

Airports in Berkshire County, Massachusetts
Buildings and structures in North Adams, Massachusetts